Jahangir Bey Kazimbeyli, also known as Jahangir Bey Kazimbeyov (15 March 1894 – 17 January 1955), was an Azerbaijani military officer who had served in the Russian, Azerbaijani and Polish armies. He is known as one of the leaders of the Ganja revolt in 1920.

Early life 
Jahangir Bey Kazimbeyli was born on 15 March 1894, in Elisabethpol (modern-day Ganja). He graduated from Ganja Men's Gymnasium.

Military service

Russia 
In 1902, Kazimbeyli entered military service in the Imperial Russian Army. Three years later, he was promoted to a cornet. Kazimbeyli fought in the Eastern Front of World War I during his military service in Russia. He completed his military career in the Imperial Russian Army in 1917 as a lieutenant colonel.

Azerbaijan 
In January 1919, Kazimbeyli joined the ranks of the newly formed Azerbaijani Special Corps. On 14 January, by order of the Minister of War, General of Artillery, Samad Bey Mehmandarov, he was appointed the commander of the 3rd Ganja Infantry Regiment of the 1st Infantry Division as a lieutenant colonel. On 24 March 1920, by the order of the military department, Jahangir Bey Kazimbeyli was promoted to a colonel.

Kazimbeyli was one of the organizers of the Ganja revolt, directed against the newly established Soviet rule in Azerbaijan after Red Army's invasion of the country. He served as the commander of the Ganja garrison during the revolt. After the suppression of the revolt, Kazimbeyli fled to neighbouring Georgia with a small detachment under his command. From there, he emigrated to Turkey.

Poland 

In 1923, Kazimbeyli moved to Poland and in the same year became a contract officer in the Polish Army. He took courses for students of the Polish Armed Forces, commanded a battalion and a regiment until the German invasion in 1939.

Political career 
Kazimbeyli became one of the active participants in the Azerbaijani émigré movement during World War II. It was he who was entrusted with the opening of the Azerbaijani National Congress, held in 1943, in Berlin.

Later life and death 
After the end of World War II, he moved to Italy and lived there for some time, and then settled in Turkey. He died in 1955, in Berlin, under unknown circumstances. He was buried in Mosque of Martyrdom in Berlin.

References 

1855 births
1955 deaths
People from Ganja, Azerbaijan
Polish people of Azerbaijani descent
Azerbaijani emigrants to Germany
Participants of the Ganja revolt
Azerbaijani colonels
Imperial Russian Army personnel
Polish Army officers
20th-century Polish military personnel
Russian military personnel of World War I
Azerbaijani military personnel of World War I
Azerbaijani anti-communists